Christopher Sean Chester (born January 12, 1983) is a former American football guard. He played college football at Oklahoma and was drafted by the Baltimore Ravens in the second round of the 2006 NFL Draft. He also played for the Washington Redskins and Atlanta Falcons.

Early years
Chester attended Tustin High School in Tustin, California. He recorded 815 yards and 11 touchdowns as a senior and  rushed for 450 yards and five touchdowns. This led him to be named defensive player of the year in his league. He was also a Golden West All-League as a junior and senior and a first-team All-Orange County by the Los Angeles Times.

Chester was also and a second-team All-league pick in basketball as a junior and a first-team All-league in the discus and shot put as a junior.

Chester was ranked as the eighth best tight end in the nation by Rivals.com.

College career
Chester played college football at the University of Oklahoma. For the first three years, he played as a tight end for the Sooners, but switched over to being an offensive lineman in his senior year. He graduated from the University of Oklahoma with a degree in political science in 2006.

Professional career

At the 2006 NFL Combine he ran the fastest time for an offensive lineman at 4.83 seconds.

Baltimore Ravens
Chester was selected by the Baltimore Ravens in the second round (56th overall) in the 2006 NFL Draft. In his rookie season, he played in 11 games making four starts. He helped to protect the quarterback and only 17 sacks were allowed, the 2nd fewest in the league. He made his NFL debut at the Denver Broncos on October 9, 2006.

In 2008, Chester was converted from the offensive line to tight end and switched from No. 65 to No. 48. His first NFL action at the new position came against the Pittsburgh Steelers on September 29. He later switched back to the offensive line and No. 65 in October.

Washington Redskins
In July 2011, Chester signed a five-year contract with the Washington Redskins. He was the only member of the Redskins' offensive line to start and play in all 16 games of the 2011 season at the same position. On May 27, 2015, Chester was released. During his four-year stint with the Redskins, Chester started all 64 games.

Atlanta Falcons
On May 30, 2015, Chester signed a one-year deal with the Atlanta Falcons. He played and started in all 16 games for the Atlanta Falcons in the 2015 season. On April 20, 2016 Chester re-signed with the Falcons.

In the 2016 season, Chester and the Falcons reached Super Bowl LI on February 5, 2017 but  the Falcons would fall in a 34–28 overtime defeat to the New England Patriots, .

On March 31, 2017, Chester announced his retirement from the NFL.

Personal life
Chester lives in Frisco, Texas with his wife and three children. He is also a devout Christian.

References

External links

Atlanta Falcons bio 
Oklahoma Sooners bio

1983 births
Living people
People from Tustin, California
American football offensive guards
American football centers
American football tight ends
Atlanta Falcons players
Baltimore Ravens players
Oklahoma Sooners football players
Players of American football from California
Sportspeople from Orange County, California
Washington Redskins players